Lithuania participated at the 2017 Summer Universiade in Taipei, Taiwan, from 19 to 30 August 2017.

Medal summary

Team

Athletics

Track

Field

Basketball 

Legend: W = win

Diving

Gymnastics 

Legend: FX = score and rank in floor exercise, PH = score and rank in pommel horse, RG = score and rank in rings, VT = score and rank in vault, PB = score and rank in parallel bars, HB = score and rank in horizontal bar, Q = qualified, R = reserve

Judo 

Legend: W = win

Swimming

Weightlifting

References

External links 
 NUSF Overview — Lithuania

Lithuania at the Summer Universiade
2017 in Lithuanian sport
Nations at the 2017 Summer Universiade